Jana Andrsová (Večtomová; 8 August 1939 – 16 February 2023) was a Czech ballerina and actress. In 1957 she graduated from the Dance Conservatory in Prague and began to work with the Vitus Nejedly Army Art Ensemble.

Laterna Magika
From 1959 to 1978, Andrsová worked with Josef Svoboda's avant-garde multimedia company Laterna Magika, initially as a chorus girl and later (beginning in 1973) as a prima ballerina. In Allen Hughes' review of the company's August 1964 Carnegie Hall debut of a presentation that gave 23 performances at that venue under the direction of Miloš Forman, they are described as "a Czech theatrical spectacle that first came to international attention at the Brussels World's Fair." In 1966 Andrsová starred in Alfréd Radok's choreographed multimedia production Laterna Magika: Variation 66, The Opening of the Wells, cowritten by Forman in collaboration with Jan Švankmajer.

Retirement and death
In retirement, Andrsová continued to make stage appearances. In 2014 (also a 2016 reprise) she performed as elderly virtuous heroine Madame de Rosemonde in the National Theatre Ballet world premiere production of Valmont, choreographer Libor Vaculík's adaptation of Les Liaisons dangereuses.

Andrsová died on 16 February 2023, at the age of 83.

Filmography
 Strakonický dudák (1955) – wood nymph
 Jak se Franta naučil bát (1959) – miller's daughter Veronika
 Rusalka (1962) – Rusalka (part sung by Milada Šubrtová)
 Hoffmannovy povídky (1962) – Olympia
 Dvanáctého (1963) – dancer
 Svět je báječné místo k narození (1968) – herself
 Bludiště moci (1969) – ballerina
 Kočičí princ (1978) – mother

Notes

References

External Links
 

1939 births
2023 deaths
20th-century Czech actresses
Czechoslovak actresses
Czech dancers
Actresses from Prague
Prima ballerinas
Czech ballerinas